Empress Guangxian may refer to:

Empress Dowager Zhang (Former Zhao), empress dowager of Han Zhao
Börte, wife of Genghis Khan of the Mongol Empire